A metatrochophore is a type of larva developed from the trochophore larva of a polychaete annelid.

Metatrochophores have a number of features trochophores lack, including eyespots and segments.

References

Larvae
Annelids